The European Health Insurance Card (EHIC) is issued free of charge and allows anyone who is insured by or covered by a statutory social security scheme of the EEA countries, Switzerland, and the United Kingdom to receive medical treatment in another member state free or at a reduced cost, if that treatment becomes necessary during their visit (for example, due to illness or an accident), or if they have a chronic pre-existing condition which requires care such as kidney dialysis. The term of validity of the card varies according to the issuing country. Continued reciprocal healthcare access between the EU and the UK has been agreed, and the UK is issuing a new UK Global Health Insurance Card (GHIC) valid in the EU.

The intention of the scheme is to allow people to continue their stay in a country without having to return home for medical care; as such, it does not cover people who have visited a country for the purpose of obtaining medical care, nor does it cover non-urgent care that can be delayed until the individual returns to their home country (for example, most dental care). The costs not covered by self-liability fees are paid by the issuing country, which is usually the country of residence but may also be the country where one receives the most pension from.

It only covers healthcare which is normally covered by a statutory health care system in the visited country, so it does not render travel insurance obsolete.

History
The card was phased in from 1 June 2004 and throughout 2005, becoming the sole healthcare entitlement document on 1 January 2006.

It replaced the following medical forms:
 E110 – For international road hauliers
 E111 – For tourists
 E119 – For unemployed people/job seekers
 E128 – For students and workers in another member state

Territorial applicability
The card is applicable in all French overseas departments (Martinique, Guadeloupe, Réunion, and French Guiana) as they are part of the EEA, but not non-EEA dependent territories such as Aruba, or French Polynesia. However, there are agreements for the use of the EHIC in the Faroe Islands and Greenland, even though they are not in the EEA.

Personal eligibility
The reason for the existence of this card, is that the right to health care in the European Union is based on the country of legal residence, not the country of citizenship. Therefore, a passport is not enough to receive health care. It is however possible that a photo ID document is asked for, since the European Health Insurance Card does not contain a photo.

In some cases, even if a person is covered by the health insurance of an EU country, one is not eligible for a European Health Insurance Card. For instance, in Romania, a person who is currently insured has to have been insured for the previous five years to be eligible.

Third party application processors
European Health Insurance cards are provided free to all legal residents of participating countries. There are however various businesses who act as non-official agents on behalf of individuals, arranging supply of the cards in return for payment, often offering additional services such as the checking of applications for errors and general advice or assistance. This has proved extremely controversial. In 2010 the British government moved against companies that invited people to pay for the free EHIC, falsely implying that through payment the applicant could speed up the process.

Participating member states
As of 2021, 31 countries in Europe participate: the 30 member states of the European Economic Area (EEA) plus Switzerland. This includes the 27 member states of the European Union (EU) and 4 member states of the European Free Trade Association (EFTA).

Former participant states

United Kingdom
The United Kingdom was a participant in the scheme as a member of the European Union until its withdrawal from the organisation. It continued to participate provisionally until the end of the Brexit transition period on 31 December 2020. 

The EU–UK Trade and Cooperation Agreement grants continued reciprocal healthcare access between the EU and the UK. EU citizens will be able to continue to use their EHIC within the UK, while EHIC in the UK will be replaced by a new UK Global Health Insurance Card (GHIC). While the GHIC is not valid in Norway, Iceland, and Liechtenstein some UK residents/nationals can apply a new UK-issued EHIC valid for visits to these countries as well Switzerland since 2022. Eligible persons are those who meet one of the following criteria:

 those living in the EU, Switzerland, Norway, Iceland, or Liechtenstein, and have been since before 1 January 2021 with a registered S1, E121, E106 or E109 form issued by the UK
 those living in the EU, Switzerland, Norway, Iceland, or Liechtenstein, since before 1 January 2021 with an A1 issued by the UK
 those who are a national of the EU, Switzerland, Norway, Iceland, or Liechtenstein who have legally resided in the UK since before 1 January 2021 and are covered under the Withdrawal Agreement; one may not be covered if they also a UK national or if they were born in the UK
 those who are a family member or dependant of an entitled individual already listed
 those who are a Chen or Ibrahim/Teixeira carer

During its participation in the scheme, EHIC access covered the British overseas territory of Gibraltar. The crown dependencies of the Channel Islands and Isle of Man were not supplied coverage under the EHIC due to having never been members of the EU and EEA, and their residents were not eligible for EHICs.

See also
 Healthcare in the European Union
 Italian health insurance card
 Carte Vitale
 European driving licence

Notes

References

External links

 
UK GHIC information at gov.uk
UK GHIC application
General UK GHIC information
Irish EHIC site – includes details of coverage in various countries
Dutch EHIC website
The European Health Insurance Card: What It Is and How to Use It

Health and the European Union
Universal health care
Health insurance cards